The sphagnum frog (Philoria sphagnicolus) is a frog in the family Limnodynastidae. The species was first described by John Alexander Moore in 1958. Its natural habitats are subtropical moist upland forests, subtropical moist montane forests, and streams.  They vary in colour from shades of yellow and orange.  They usually have irregular black spots that range all over their body. Their main source of diet comes from small insects, usually ants.  This species has been classified as endangered in 2004. It is threatened by climate change pathogens and habitat loss. It is endemic to Australia.  There have been other recommendations by scientist and other groups made to protect this species.  Some of these recommendations are exclude logging around breeding areas, prevent pollution of streams and wetlands, and maintain vegetation and deep-leaf litter around streams.

References

 Sphagnum Frog - profile 	

Philoria
Amphibians of Queensland
Amphibians of New South Wales
Amphibians described in 1958
Taxonomy articles created by Polbot
Frogs of Australia